The 12th Houston Film Critics Society Awards nominations were announced on December 17, 2018. The ceremony was held on January 3, 2019.

Winners and nominees 
Winners are listed first and highlighted with boldface.

Movies with multiple nominations and awards

The following films received multiple nominations:

References

External links 
 Houston Film Critics Society: Awards

2018
2018 film awards
2018 in Texas
Houston